Browneller Run is a  long 2nd order tributary to the Youghiogheny River in Fayette County, Pennsylvania. This is the only stream of this name in the United States.

Course

Watershed
Browneller Run drains  of area, receives about 40.6 in/year of precipitation, has a wetness index of 317.83, and is about 39% forested.

Natural History
Browneller Run is the location of Brownller Run Confluence BDA, which contains a mature upland forest and a riverine forest as well as a rare plant species.

References

 
Tributaries of the Ohio River
Rivers of Pennsylvania
Rivers of Fayette County, Pennsylvania
Rivers of Westmoreland County, Pennsylvania
Allegheny Plateau